Euphaedra preussiana, or Preuss' Ceres forester, is a butterfly in the family Nymphalidae. It is found in Nigeria and from Cameroon to the Democratic Republic of the Congo.

Subspecies
Euphaedra preussiana preussiana (Cameroon, Democratic Republic of the Congo)
Euphaedra preussiana protea Hecq, 1983 (south-eastern Nigeria, western Cameroon)
Euphaedra preussiana robusta Hecq, 1983 (western Democratic Republic of the Congo)

References

Butterflies described in 1916
preussiana
Butterflies of Africa